Charles Thompson (born 1921) was a Guyanese sprinter. He competed in the men's 100 metres and men's long jump at the 1948 Summer Olympics.

References

1921 births
Possibly living people
Athletes (track and field) at the 1948 Summer Olympics
Guyanese male sprinters
Guyanese male long jumpers
Olympic athletes of British Guiana
Place of birth missing